{{DISPLAYTITLE:C21H25NO4}}
The molecular formula C21H25NO4 (molar mass: 355.42 g/mol, exact mass: 355.1784 u) may refer to:

 Glaucine, an alkaloid
 LY-307,452
 Nalmexone
 Tetrahydropalmatine, an alkaloid
 Yuanhunine

Molecular formulas